Uncle is a British sitcom written and directed by Oliver Refson and Lilah Vandenburgh. Originally broadcast between 2014 and 2017, it stars Nick Helm, Daisy Haggard, Elliot Speller-Gillott and Sydney Rae White, and features original songs by Helm.

A pilot episode was first broadcast on Channel 4 in December 2012, before the show was commissioned by BBC Three. The first episode from the series, a remake of the pilot, aired on 13 January 2014. The show was renewed for a second series, and it premiered on BBC Three on 10 February 2015. In December 2015, Helm announced on social media that the programme would return for a third and final series. It premiered on 1 January 2017 on BBC Three on the BBC iPlayer app, and was later broadcast on BBC One on 6 January 2017.

Production
The show was commissioned by the BBC after a pilot was originally broadcast on Channel 4. The pilot episode aired on the channel in December 2012, as part of a strand called 4Funnies. When Channel 4's head of comedy, Shane Allen moved to the BBC, he brought the show with him. Uncle was written by Oliver Refson for Baby Cow Productions. Comedian Nick Helm explained that the show was inspired by Wes Anderson's comedy film The Royal Tenenbaums and thought it fitted in with other comedy shows produced by Baby Cow. He said that while the show was not written for him, it was 75 per cent of what he would have done himself.

Uncle is filmed on-location in Croydon. Exterior scenes have been filmed at George Street, Thornton Heath and Surrey Street Market. Interior locations include the Hustler Club and a house in Purley. Helm plays Andy, a musician who is on the verge of suicide when he finds himself looking after his quirky and weird 12-year-old nephew Errol (Elliot Speller-Gillott). Of Uncle, Helm said "There's an unconventional family at the show's core – the uncle and nephew and the single mum. They obviously are an actual family, but they create this unconventional revised family unit. That's what's nice about it."

On 17 February 2014, it was announced Uncle had been renewed for a second series. Helm said he was "gobsmacked" that he had been involved in a show that had proved popular with audiences and was looking forward to working with all the cast and crew on the new series. Allen, the BBC Comedy commissioner commented "Oli's often edgy yet warm-hearted comedy, along with Nick and Elliot's unique chemistry, have proved an instant hit with the audience and critics alike. We're thrilled to have this wayward relative in the BBC Three family." The second series went into production in late 2014 and was broadcast in 2015.

The original pilot was broadcast on Channel 4, although the following two series were broadcast on rival channel BBC Three. In a Digital Spy interview headlining actor Nick Helm discussed ways in which he believed the programme may have been different if it had remained with Channel 4. Following the decision to convert BBC Three into a digital-only channel, there was speculation that any potential third series of Uncle might be moved to BBC Two. However, in December 2015 the third series was announced by the BBC, with a strong suggestion that it would remain on BBC Three as an online broadcast, followed by repeats on BBC One.

Cast

 Nick Helm as Andy King
 Elliot Speller-Gillott as Errol Meyer
 Daisy Haggard as Sam
 Sydney Rae White as Gwen
 Nicholas Burns as Ben
 Esther Smith as Melodie
 Con O'Neill as Val
 Daniel Lawrence Taylor as Bruce
 Nina Toussaint-White as Shelley
 Brett Goldstein as Casper
 Jorja Rutherford as Tiffany
 Lauran Taylor-Griffin as Ruby
 Lewis Reeves as Ryan (Season 2)
 Raquel Cassidy as Teresa (Season 2-3)
 Gemma Whelan as Veronica (Season 2-3)
 Nick Mohammed as Roopesh (Season 2-3)
 Dylan Moran as Marsh (Season 3)

Series overview

Episodes

Series 1 (2014)

Series 2 (2015)

Series 3 (2017)

Reception
Sam Wollaston from The Guardian gave the show a positive review, saying "Uncle manages to be warm as well as dark and rude. And hilarious. It could well be the thing to fill the (good) comedy void since Him & Her and Toast of London ended." Gary Rose from the Radio Times gave the show a mixed review. He thought it was hard to find sympathy for Andy, while Errol was "a great little character". Rose liked the song and dance number, calling it "a satisfying injection of quirkiness."

Uncle won Best Multichannel Programme at the 2015 Broadcast Awards. The judges described it as "a truly original show with brilliant performances and great writing".

International broadcast
The programme premiered in Australia on 12 January 2015 on SBS One., and also features on Australian online streaming service, Stan. 
Broadcast of the series was aired in Saudi Arabia and the Middle East in the summer of 2015 by BBC Entertainment on Orbit Showtime Network (OSN).

Adaptations

In South Korea, local production company Monster Union (a Korean Broadcasting System subsidiary) has collaborated with Celltrion Entertainment and Hi Ground to produce a local adaptation of Uncle. It will be broadcast in 2021 via TV Chosun.

Home media
The first series of Uncle was released onto DVD on 16 March 2015. The Complete Collection was released on DVD in 2017. The official soundtrack album, featuring original songs by Helm, is also available from the iTunes Store.

References

External links
 
 

2014 British television series debuts
2017 British television series endings
2010s British sitcoms
BBC high definition shows
BBC television sitcoms
English-language television shows
Television series about dysfunctional families
Television shows set in London